Demps is a surname. Notable people with the surname include:

Cody Demps (born 1993), American basketball player
Dell Demps (born 1970), American basketball executive and former player
Jeff Demps (born 1990), American track and field athlete and former American football player
Marcus Demps (born 1983), American football player
Quintin Demps (born 1985), American football player
Tre Demps (born 1993), American basketball player
Will Demps (born 1979), American football player